The 2011–12 season of the NOFV-Oberliga was the fourth season of the league at tier five (V) of the German football league system.

The NOFV-Oberliga is split into two divisions, the NOFV-Oberliga Nord and the NOFV-Oberliga Süd. Due to league restructuring and the re-introduction of the Regionalliga Nordost for the 2012–13 season, there were a number of teams which were ineligible for promotion from the NOFV-Oberliga this season. F.C. Hansa Rostock II were champions of the NOFV-Oberliga Nord, but 1. FC Union Berlin II, FSV Optik Rathenow and TSG Neustrelitz were promoted. From the NOFV-Oberliga Süd, champions FSV Zwickau were promoted, along with VfB Auerbach and sixth-placed team 1. FC Lokomotive Leipzig. Due to results and placings in the higher league tiers, seven berths were available for teams from the 2011–12 NOFV-Oberliga for the 2012–13 Regionalliga Nordost season. Beside the six directly promoted teams, the seventh and final remaining berth was decided in a playoff between the fourth-highest respectively eligible teams from each division, Torgelower SV Greif and VfB Fortuna Chemnitz. Torgelower SV Greif won 3–1 over two legs to confirm their promotion.

North

Top goalscorers

South

Top goalscorers

NOFV applicants for the 2012–13 Regionalliga Nordost 
As of 20 April 2012, a total of 26 clubs had applied for a license for the 2012–13 Regionalliga Nordost:

 VfB Auerbach (OL Süd)
 SV Babelsberg 03 (3. Liga)
 FSV Budissa Bautzen (OL Süd)
 Berliner AK 07 (RL)
 Berliner FC Dynamo (OL Nord)
 Hertha BSC II (RL)
 1. FC Union Berlin II (OL Nord)
 BFC Viktoria 1889 (OL Nord)
 VfB Fortuna Chemnitz (OL Süd)
 FC Energie Cottbus II (RL)
 FC Rot-Weiß Erfurt (II. team ineligible for promotion)
 VfB Germania Halberstadt (RL)
 Hallescher FC (RL)
 FC Carl Zeiss Jena (3. Liga)
 1. FC Lokomotive Leipzig (OL Süd)
 RB Leipzig (RL)
 FSV 63 Luckenwalde (OL Süd)
 1. FC Magdeburg (RL)
 ZFC Meuselwitz (RL)
 TSG Neustrelitz (OL Nord)
 VFC Plauen (RL)
 FSV Optik Rathenow (OL Nord)
 F.C. Hansa Rostock II (OL Nord)
 SV Germania Schöneiche (OL Nord)
 Torgelower SV Greif (OL Nord)
 FSV Zwickau (OL Süd)

Hence, the remaining NOFV-affiliated clubs have waived their rights to promotion (or play in a higher league).

Promotion playoffs 
Torgelower SV Greif beat VfB Fortuna Chemnitz 3–1 over two legs in the playoffs to win the final remaining promotion berth to the 2012–13 Regionalliga Nordost.

First leg

Second leg

References

External links 
 NOFV-Online – official website of the North-East German Football Association 

NOFV-Oberliga seasons
NOFV